Bodley may refer to:

Surname
 Edward Fisher Bodley (1815–1881), English businessman
 George Frederick Bodley (1827–1907), English architect
 John Edward Courtenay Bodley (1853–1925), English civil servant and historian
 Josias Bodley (1550–1618), English soldier notable for his service in Ireland
 Mick Bodley (born 1967), English footballer
 R. V. C. Bodley (1892–1970), English author and military officer
 Rachel Bodley (1831–1888), American professor and university leader
 Robert Bodley (1878–1956), South African Olympic rifle shooter
 Seóirse Bodley (born 1933), Irish composer
 Thomas Bodley (1545–1613), English diplomat and founder of the Bodleian Library

Given name
 Bodley Scott (disambiguation), several people

Other
 The Bodley Head, publishing imprint founded in 1887
 Bodley Medal, literary award
 Bodley Gallery, New York
 Bodley, Devon, English village
 Bodley Survey, a study of Ireland undertaken in 1609
 Codex Bodley, Mixtec pictographic manuscript

See also
 Bodleian Library, University of Oxford